"Never Going Nowhere" was the second single released by The Bluetones from their fourth album, Luxembourg, in 2003. It reached number 39 on the UK Singles Chart. The track was later included on the band's 2006 compilation A Rough Outline: The Singles & B-Sides 95 - 03.

A 7" vinyl release was planned (b/w "Suffer In Silence") and pre-orders were taken but the 7" never made it to release. It is unknown if any copies were ever pressed. CD promos featured the 69 Corp vs the Bluetones remix as the b-side, and cover art from the inside page of the Luxembourg album booklet.

The song was featured on an episode of the British comedy show Teachers.

Track listing

CD1
"Never Going Nowhere"
"Suffer in Silence"
"Never Going Nowhere (69 Corp vs. Bluetones)"

CD2
"Never Going Nowhere"
"Pram Face"
"Choogie Monbassa"

Charts

References

The Bluetones songs
2003 singles
2003 songs
Songs written by Eds Chesters
Songs written by Adam Devlin
Songs written by Mark Morriss
Songs written by Scott Morriss